Krirk University  is a university in Bang Khen District, Bangkok, Thailand. Founded as the Languages and Professions School in 1952, it was named for its founder, Dr. Krirk Mangkhlaphrik (เกริก มังคละพฤกษ์). It was upgraded to institute of higher education in 1970 as Institute of Social Technology (Krirk) and upgraded to university status in 1995. The university today is organized into tree faculties and Politician communication and International College.

Faculties 
There are three faculties and two college.

 Faculty of Business Administration,
 Faculty of Liberal Arts,
 Faculty of Law.

There are two colleges

 International Colleges,
 Political communication College.

Academic programs 
Krirk University offer for bachelor's degree, master's degree and doctorate degrees in Thai. University also offers international programs in which Chinese is the language of instruction by native speakers and offers bachelor's degree, master's degree, and doctorate degree

Notable alumni 
 Sira Jenjaka (th)  Member of Parliament of Bangkok
 Mario Maurer actor and model
 Chintara Sukapatana actress

External links 
 English website
 ไทย

 
Universities and colleges in Bangkok
Educational institutions established in 1951
1951 establishments in Thailand
Private universities and colleges in Thailand